Glaxoa is a genus in the Tubeufiaceae family of fungi. This is a monotypic genus, containing the single species Glaxoa pellucida.

References

External links
Glaxoa at Index Fungorum

Tubeufiaceae
Monotypic Dothideomycetes genera